Janne Väyrynen (born June 26, 1992) is a Finnish professional ice hockey winger.

Väyrynen previously played in Mestis for Jukurit, Kiekko-Vantaa and Jokipojat before signing for Lukko on April 22, 2016. He played thirteen games for the team over two seasons and registered two assists while also playing on loan for KeuPa HT of Mestis.

Väyrynen rejoined for Jokipojat on May 4, 2018. He then returned to KeuPa HT as a permanent member on August 17, 2019. On October 8, 2020, Väyrynen moved to Slovakia and signed for HK Dukla Trenčín of the Tipos Extraliga.

References

External links

1992 births
Living people
HK Dukla Trenčín players
Finnish ice hockey forwards
Jokipojat players
KeuPa HT players
Kiekko-Vantaa players
Lukko players
Mikkelin Jukurit players
People from Järvenpää
Finnish expatriate ice hockey players in Sweden
Finnish expatriate ice hockey players in Slovakia
Nybro Vikings players